Tiffany Ann Andrade (born July 11, 1985) is an American beauty queen and nurse from Linden, New Jersey who competed for the Miss USA 2008 title.

Andrade won the Miss New Jersey USA 2008 title in late 2007, after placing third runner-up the previous two years and first runner-up at Miss New Jersey Teen USA 2003. On April 11, 2008, Tiffany Andrade was 2nd runner up at the Miss USA 2008 pageant, New Jersey's first placement since 1997 and its highest since 1991.

Andrade is a 2003 graduate of Linden High School. She recently graduated from Wagner College in Staten Island, New York with a Bachelor of Science Degree in Nursing and is currently a Registered Nurse in the Pediatric Intensive Care Unit at NewYork-Presbyterian Hospital-Weill Cornell Medical Center. She is married to Frank DiCarlo.

References

External links
Miss New Jersey USA official website

Linden High School (New Jersey) alumni
People from Linden, New Jersey
Living people
1985 births
Miss USA 2008 delegates
Wagner College alumni
American nurses
American women nurses